"Do I Make You Wanna" is a song written by Ashley Gorley, Zach Crowell, Matt Jenkins and Jerry Flowers and recorded by American country music artist Billy Currington. It was released in November 2016 as the fourth single from Currington's 2015 album Summer Forever.

Commercial performance
"Do I Make You Wanna" reached No. 1 on the Country Airplay chart on August 12, 2017, and stayed at that position for three consecutive weeks. As of September 2017, the song has sold 190,000 copies in the US.

Charts

Weekly charts

Year-end charts

Certifications

References

2015 songs
2016 singles
Billy Currington songs
Mercury Nashville singles
Songs written by Ashley Gorley
Songs written by Zach Crowell
Songs written by Matt Jenkins
Songs written by Jerry Flowers
Song recordings produced by Dann Huff